"Only God Knows Why" is a song by American musician Kid Rock. It was recorded in 1998 for his album Devil Without a Cause, on which it features as the eleventh track. The song was the first recorded ballad on record by Kid Rock. It was a weary road ballad in which the first four lines were written while he was in jail after a bar fight after signing to Atlantic Records in 1997.

The song was released as a single in 1999 and peaked at number 19 on the Billboard Hot 100, eventually ranking at number 67 on the Billboard Year-End Hot 100 for 2000. VH1 named it the 19th greatest power ballad in 2002. Outlaw country singer David Allan Coe released a live cover version on his release Live at Billy Bob's in 2003.

Music video
The music video is a montage of stage performances, his off time during touring, wandering the streets of and riding the streetcars in New Orleans and his performance at Woodstock 1999. The most infamous scenes are him getting hit with a full wine bottle in the head onstage, along with an overzealous fan following him to his car with security holding him back. His band, mother, father, and son are featured (during the part he sings "I watch my youngest son and it helps to pass the time"). There are cameos by other stars like Mark McGrath of Sugar Ray, Gibby Haynes of Butthole Surfers and Hank Williams Jr. whose appearance comes after Kid Rock appeared in his "Naked Women and Beer" video.

There is a censored version, with the buttocks of a stripper blurred out while Kid Rock is signing it and when he makes a gun gesture which is blurred out.

Track listing
CD single
 "Only God Knows Why" (Radio Edit)
 "Only God Knows Why" (German Radio Edit)
 "Wasting Time" (Live)

Personnel
 Kid Rock – vocals, acoustic guitar
 Kenny Olson – lead guitar
 Bobby East – slide guitar
 Jimmie Bones – piano, organ
 Stephanie Eulinberg – drums, percussion

Charts

Peak positions

End of year charts

References

1998 songs
1999 singles
American blues rock songs
American country music songs
Kid Rock songs
Country ballads
Songs written by Kid Rock
Southern rock songs